The 2001–02 FR Yugoslavia Cup was the tenth and last full season of the FR Yugoslavia's annual football cup. The cup defenders was FK Partizan, but was defeated by FK Železnik in the quarter-finals. Red Star Belgrade has the winner of the competition, after they defeated FK Sartid.

First round
Thirty-two teams entered in the First Round. The matches were played on 10 October 2001.

|}
1The match was played in Belgrade.Note: Roman numerals in brackets denote the league tier the clubs participated in the 2001–02 season.

Second round
The 16 winners from the prior round enter this round. The matches were played on 23, 24, 30 October 2001.

|}
Note: Roman numerals in brackets denote the league tier the clubs participated in the 2001–02 season.

Quarter-finals
The eight winners from the prior round enter this round. The matches were played on 21 and 27 November 2001.

|}
Note: Roman numerals in brackets denote the league tier the clubs participated in the 2001–02 season.

Semi-finals

Final

See also
 2001–02 First League of FR Yugoslavia
 2001–02 Second League of FR Yugoslavia

References

External links
Results on RSSSF

FR Yugoslavia Cup
Cup
Yugo